The 1985 Hofmeister World Doubles was the fourth staging of the doubles snooker tournament. It was played at the Derngate in Northampton and held between 4 and 15 December 1985 with the tournament televised on ITV.

Defending champions Alex Higgins and Jimmy White's hopes ended at the qualifying stages. Steve Davis and Tony Meo went on to regain the title beating Ray Reardon and Tony Jones who beat Dennis Taylor and Terry Griffiths in the semi-final in by now a three session final as it was with the other ITV snooker tournaments but all sessions of the final were never televised due to a strike by electricians. Davis and Meo also got the highest combined break of 174 in their semi-final match against Cliff Thorburn and Willie Thorne.

Results
Results from the last 16 onwards are shown below. Winning players are denoted in bold.

Selected earlier results
Played in Birmingham 6–7 November 1985

Qualifying Round

Last 32

References

World Doubles Championship
World Doubles Championship
World Doubles Championship
World Doubles Championship